The East Taihang Glasswalk is a skywalk bridge located in East Taihang Mountains, Hebei Province, China.

The bridge was the subject of some controversy for a special effect that made it appear as if the glass was cracking beneath the feet of those trying to cross it. Infrared sensors would determine when a pedestrian was walking across the bridge, at which point light decorations and sound effects would produce the illusion of glass cracking. The administration of East Taihang officially apologized for the illusion shortly after the bridge's opening, saying that the effect was designed to be "provocative".

The East Taihang Glasswalk was part of a larger design scheme in China to create "invisible" glass-bottomed footbridges. Other notable skywalks of this variety include the Zhangjiajie Glass Bridge and the Yuntain Mountain Walkway. After a series of deaths and injuries on glass bridges in Hebei, the province elected to close all 32 of its glass-bottomed skywalks, including the East Taihang Glasswalk, on October 30, 2019, while it examined their safety protocols.

See also 
 Zhangjiajie Glass Bridge

References 

Buildings and structures in Hebei
Tourist attractions in Hebei
Buildings and structures completed in 2017
Glass-bottomed bridges